Eivind Waage Austad (born 3 November 1973 in Bergen, Norway) is a Norwegian jazz pianist living in Bergen.

Biography 
Austad attended the Jazz program at the Norwegian University of Science and Technology in Trondheim (NTNU), and received  a Bachelor's degree in jazz performance. Later he earned a Master's degree in Music teaching at the Bergen University College (Hib). He has been working as a freelance musician since the mid 1990s and has played in different musical settings and with musicians like Kjetil Møster, Thomas T. Dahl, Frode Alnæs, Sigurd Køhn, Elisabeth Lid Trøen, Ole Hamre, Håkon Mjåset Johansen, Frank Jakobsen, Ernst-Wiggo Sandbakk, Magne Thormodsæter, Signe Førre, and Sigvart Dagsland. His main jazz projects are his own Eivind Austad Trio and the jazz quartet Living Space, fronted by the saxophonist Kjetil Møster.

Austad released his debut solo album Moving in 2015, with his trio including bassist Magne Thormodsæter and drummer Håkon Mjåset Johansen. He also collaborates in projects with the multi-artist Ole Hamre, different kinds of theater groups, different band gigs, and as an accompanist for different singers and choirs. He is a long time faculty member of the Grieg Academy, where he holds a post as Assistant Professor in jazz piano, ear training, arranging/composition, jazz history and ensemble.

Discography

Solo albums 
 With Eivind Austad Trio
 2015: Moving (Ozella)
 2019: Northbound (Losen)
 2022: Live in Oslo (Austad Music)

 With Eivind Austad New Orleans Trio
 2020: That feeling (Losen Records)

Collaborations 
 With Sølvi Helén Hopland
 2001: Ein Løvetann (Gilead)

 With Karin Park
 2003: Superworldunknown (Waterfall Records, Universal)

 With Vise menn
 2004: «Forbud mot å fly» (In Productions)

 With Tone Lise Moberg
 2006: Looking On (NorCD)

 With Ole Amund Gjersvik
 2006: “Circus” (Acoustic records)
 2013: “Latin collection” (Acoustic records)
 2014: All Together Now (Acoustic Records)

References

External links 
 

20th-century Norwegian pianists
21st-century Norwegian pianists
Norwegian jazz pianists
Norwegian jazz composers
Musicians from Bergen
1973 births
Living people